The 2021–22 season is the 91st season in the existence of WSG Tirol and the club's tenth consecutive season in the top flight of Austrian football. In addition to the domestic league, WSG Tirol are participating in this season's edition of the Austrian Cup.

Players

First-team squad

Transfers

Pre-season and friendlies

Competitions

Overall record

Austrian Football Bundesliga

League table

Results summary

Results by round

Matches
The league fixtures were announced on 22 June 2021.

Austrian Cup

References

WSG Tirol